To Fly! is a 1976 American short docudrama film by Greg MacGillivray and Jim Freeman of MacGillivray Freeman Films. It was the premiere film of the National Air and Space Museum's giant-screen IMAX theater, which opened for the museum's current building to celebrate the United States Bicentennial. The film chronicles the history of aviation in the US and its effects on humanity, with a narration written by Thomas McGrath. The film explores the search for national identity and humanity's destined relationship with aviation.

The idea of the film was proposed in 1970 and was revisited four years later following NASM director Michael Collins' interest in an IMAX theater for the museum. MacGillivray and Freeman expanded a treatment developed by the Smithsonian Institution and Francis Thompson, Inc, adding humor to tell audiences the film is not littered with technical jargon. Due to the large dimensions of the IMAX screen, the filmmakers aimed for immersion and clarity via novel cinematographic techniques. Three cameras were modified to meet MacGillivray and Freeman's needs. Creation of the closing space sequence prompted experiments due to the limits of the IMAX cameras and format. The film was edited by MacGillivray and Freeman while the score was composed by Bernardo Segall. The film was finished on schedule, despite a low budget and difficult year of production.

To Fly! was released on July 1, 1976. It was scheduled for a year of screening during the Bicentennial, but due to public demand was screened indefinitely. The film was later released in other formats, and had a 20th-anniversary special edition in 1996. The film was deemed significant for introducing audiences to the then-new IMAX format and influencing future filmmakers, and was inducted into the National Film Registry as well as the IMAX Hall of Fame. It also cast MacGillivray as a major IMAX filmmaker. Amassing a large following and a notable role in the growing popularity of museum IMAX theaters, To Fly! remained the highest-grossing giant-screen documentary for several decades. It received acclaim for its cinematography, editing, and narrative; it was hailed as a Washingtonian icon and received various accolades.

Summary 
To Fly! is a short film that runs for approximately 27 minutes. It begins in Vermont on July 4, 1831. Fictional hot-air balloonist Ezekiel, after reciting a patriotic quatrain declaring himself a pioneer, ascends on a voyage around New England. Spectators below look at the hot-air balloon in awe and surprise. Ezekiel sees a canoeist heading for whitewater at Horseshoe Falls and warns him ashore before he reaches the rapid.

The film then chronicles the history of aviation, beginning with hot-air balloons. The dawn of aviation is described as "like the opening of a new eye", allowing humans to reach untouched places and extend human limits. The desire to fly also inspired the creation of skyscrapers. Although hot-air balloons were revolutionary, the majority of Americans still used horses; faster trains were invented, then cars and mechanical aircraft. The Roaring Twenties saw the invention of barnstorming, expanding access to aviation among Americans. Military aviation formed flight demonstration squadrons like the Blue Angels. With airlines, flying became a common mode of travel and access to the American territory expanded westward beyond the contiguous United States. After wide-body aircraft, ultralight aviation was invented.

To Fly! ends with the launch of the Saturn IB rocket as part of the Apollo–Soyuz mission, at the Kennedy Space Center on July 15, 1975. After dubbing spaceflight a historical feat, the narrator suggests it can be used to discover extraterrestrial life, and uses it to describe human imagination as limitless, which is credited to the philosophical awakening caused by the vertical view of the world. The film ends with a view of Earth, and the narration:
We have come a long way from a time when people gazed enviously upon the birds in-flight. Today, we look upon our planet from afar, and feel a new tenderness for the tiny and fragile Earth. For we know now, that even as we walk upon the ground, we are ever in-flight through the universe. And so, we begin to realize that human destiny has ever been, and always must be, to fly!

Production

Background 

The 1960s and 1970s saw increasing numbers of museum theaters as part of the effort to modernize museums with audiovisual content. The idea of a giant-screen theater at the National Air and Space Museum (NASM) was mooted in 1970 in a 153-page report by the National Museum of Natural History (NMNH) curator team, which argues the NASM needs a "contemporary medium of communications" that will resonate intellectually and psychologically. The report suggested a giant-screen experiential film that would showcase the American landscape and the country's introduction to technology, ending with predictions of the country's future. Among these giant-screen film formats was IMAX, characterized by its tall screen which fills the audiences' peripheral vision, immersing them into the film. The NMNH proposed a panoramic, curved IMAX screen at the NMNH's rotunda, but the idea was later discarded.

In 1974, after hearing the Smithsonian Institution was to open a new building of the NASM at the National Mall in Washington, D.C. as part of the US Bicentennial, filmmaker and IMAX Corporation founder Graeme Ferguson proposed an IMAX theater to the museum's director, astronaut Michael Collins. While Ferguson believed an IMAX screen would be a big contribution to the museum, Collins had not seen an IMAX film and initially rejected the proposal. When he visited Expo '74, an IMAX representative convinced him to attend the event's own IMAX theater and see Man Belongs to the Earth, a 23-minute environmentalist documentary film. Collins became convinced that an IMAX theater at the NASM—the first museum to have one—would provide a sense of realism to visitors. The proposal was supported by then-deputy director Melvin B. Zisfein, who later wrote two film treatments. While neither treatment was ultimately used, they had major influences on the final product.

Pre-production

On July 1, 1974 giant-screen filmmaker Francis Thompson proposed a film about the history of flight to play as part of the Bicentennial and as the NASM theater's premiere film. With a US$750,000 investment from Conoco Inc., they set the project's deadline for 1976. Conoco helped fund the project "as a Bicentennial gift" to the NASM. After writing a third treatment with production and consultation company Francis Thompson, Inc., the Smithsonian commissioned filmmakers Greg MacGillivray and James "Jim" Freeman to make the film. Collins told MacGillivray and Freeman he did not want the film to be too history-oriented and more fun-oriented. MacGillivray praised Collins for giving him full creative freedom.

Collins and Zisfein gave around 30 suggestions, over 20 of which were incorporated into the film. MacGillivray and Freeman thought the treatment was imperfect and expanded it into "a chronological story that contained humor, comical fictitious characters, and [...] a little bit of flight history". They took inspiration from their earlier surf films and experience with aerial filmmaking. They analyzed other IMAX films for inspiration and reference, including Man Belongs to the Earth, whose opening aerial shot of the Grand Canyon enthused them. They wrote To Fly! as a mix of genres to give audiences a compact definition of IMAX. The opening scene is humorous so audiences would realize the film was not a dry historical drama. Thompson agreed with this decision, saying there were enough fact-based Bicentennial films and that people needed more entertainment. MacGillivray said IMAX is perfect for the film because it "allow[s] myself as a filmmaker to impact the audience in a greater way". MacGillivray and Freeman storyboarded the film, thinking of self-coined "IMAX moments" to thrill IMAX audiences and to rely on visuals more than narration. Each scene was drawn with immersion in mind.

While there is no comprehensive cast list, actress Ellen Bry is listed playing an unnamed role. Meanwhile, New York City-based actor and real-life balloonist, Peter Walker, was chosen to play the role of Ezekiel due to his comic charm. The character of Ezekiel himself was based upon Jean-Pierre Blanchard, a hot-air balloonist who in 1793 made a first-in-North-America flight over New England while reciting self-written poems, purportedly to impress young women. Walker listed To Fly! among his favorite films to star in.

The film's writers include Thompson, Robert M. Young, and Arthur Zegart. Thomas McGrath wrote the narration. Seven months were spent on research, with Collins, physicist Jeffrey Kirsch, astronomer Paul Knappenberger, and aviators Walter J. Boyne and Donald S. Lopez Sr. as technical advisors. The camera assistant was Freeman's girlfriend Cindy Huston; MacGillivray's girlfriend Barbara Smith was the production assistant, craft service specialist, still photographer, and behind-the-scenes videographer; Bill Bennett and Jeff Blyth were the production managers; Brad Ohlund was the second assistant camera and assistant grip; and Phil Schwartz was the first. Other credits include Byron McKinney as executive producer, Elizabeth Howell as secretary and bookkeeper, Rae Troutman as grip, as well as John Divers as storyboard developer. Television documentarian and historian Jon Wilkman was briefly involved in pre-production. NASA, the Office of Naval Research, and the California Institute of Technology were involved in the production. According to MacGillivray, To Fly! was the most fun film that he and Freeman worked on throughout their 11 years of partnership.

Filming 
Principal photography occurred throughout 1975 and lasted five months, as per the schedule, with a relatively small budget of $590,000. Filming was paused in June to film the action scenes of Sky Riders (1976). MacGillivray and Freeman directed and cinematographed To Fly!, frequently switching roles while working seven days a week and 14 hours a day. As firm believers of filmmaking as a collaboration, MacGillivray and Freeman invited the crew to make creative suggestions.

They were worried about damaging the only camera available to them, and wanted to minimize the need for retakes. Ferguson and fellow IMAX co-founders, Bill Shaw and Robert Kerr, proposed creating three new cameras with better specifications. MacGillivray said the cameras would also be used for American Years, a 50-minute epic IMAX film for the temporary Philadelphia '76 theater, also a Bicentennial celebration. Ferguson granted the proposal. While filming To Fly!, one scene required the use of a second camera that was attached to a parachute, which failed to deploy, destroying the camera.

It took three months to test the cameras and other equipment. To make the film bright, colorful, and naturalistic, production used the Eastman Color Negative 5254 tungsten 65 mm film stock and a standard Tiffen 85 photographic filter. They reasoned the short duration on the costly film stock. To give the film a dramatic look, they used multiple light sources to emphasize the subject. Because of the IMAX screen's large dimensions and where the perceived center of the frame would be for audiences, many unconventional filming techniques were implemented. Extreme long shots were treated as wide-angle shots, while the latter were treated as normal shots. Movement was condensed to ease the switching between an extreme long shot to medium close-up, and a wide-angle lens was used to further expand the film's view. According to MacGillivray, "Plenty of headroom is needed in all closeups (in IMAX [screens, it will look like] the medium closeup) so the audience can establish comfortable eye-contact". Camera lenses were also carefully chosen. A scene with a vertical view of New York City used a 30mm fisheye lens, giving it edge curvature and image distortion. Lenses specifically built for Hasselblad cameras were modified, with their focal lengths changed, shutters removed, and mounts modified to fit the IMAX cameras. The crew had no zoom lenses available that would make filming easier; they used the first IMAX zoom lens in the later film Behold Hawaii (1983).

Many shots in the film were time-consuming: a 35-second shot of the Blue Angels flying over the Colorado River and Yuma Desert took over four months to choreograph. Camera mounts were designed by the United States Navy for a McDonnell Douglas F-4 Phantom II used to film the scene. Despite doubting it would work, Nelson Tyler spent two months developing two mounts for the camera helicopters, one to film forward-moving shots and another equipped with a camera dolly to film from the side, allowing smooth aerial shots. Remote-controlled devices were built to move the second mount. The helicopters were piloted by George Nolan, Chuck Phillips, and Adrian Brooks. Mounts were also made by Boeing for the Boeing 747, and on Art Scholl's "Super Chipmunk" aircraft, which was used to film front point-of-views. The mounts took weeks to test so the camera could stay intact without vibrating. The Navy donated helium for the opening scene's hot-air-balloon, thanks to the Blue Angels' presence in the film.

Aerial work platforms were used to support the balloon basket and the camera; two platforms supported the basket as it moved in opposing directions to heighten the illusion of actual in-flight motion". Scenes with the real hot-air balloon flying were later shot from a helicopter in West Virginia. The hot-air balloon itself was decorated with 13 American flags, the number of states in the US during the period, sewn by a vexillography shop. To create a scene in which a Sierra Railway 3 locomotive seemingly hits the camera, the film crew placed a mirror at the end of the track then pointed the wide-angle camera sideways to image the mirror for a symmetrical view of the rail as the locomotive approached and shattered the screen. For close-ups of the pilots "flying" the aircraft, the illusion was made by filming with the sky in the background while the aircraft's engines rev and the camera moves in and out of a "rough" dolly. Bob Wills flew a hang glider along the coastline of Kauai, one of the scenes Collins and Zisfein suggested.

Various kinds of transportation were used. In one scene, a stagecoach races with the locomotive; the previous scene includes a Conestoga wagon. The airborne Boeing 747 scene was filmed from a 737 that Boeing donated. Frank Tallman flew a Curtiss Model D airplane for the mechanical flight sequence. A Ford Flivver was used in a segue between the car and the mechanical flight scene: it begins with a shot pointing towards the ground and accelerating; audiences assumed this is the car but it takes off and flies above Coastal California. Other filming locations included the Gateway Arch, Lake Powell, Monument Valley, and Yosemite Falls. The barnstorming scene was filmed in California. A barn raising scene from the opening was cut from the final release.

Space sequence 

To Fly! has a space sequence, beginning with the launch of a Saturn IB rocket. As it exits Earth's atmosphere, viewers are engulfed in the dark vacuum of outer space, aided by the existential narration, as the rocket fictionally drifts beyond the Solar System. Five nebulae are depicted, before ending with a view of Earth.

The filmmakers were given special permission to film the launch, marking the first time a rocket launch was filmed on IMAX. They took this part of the production more seriously because it could not be repeated, unlike the other scenes, despite their equal level of difficulty. They left their camera outside for a day, allowing condensation to form inside it; this was exacerbated by seasonal thunderstorms. The camera was found wet and jammed, and they immediately cleaned it for around three hours. Eventually, the recording was recovered.

With a low budget, the film crew initially conceived the space sequence as merely a compilation of astronomical images but realized they needed some kind of movement for a giant-screen film and thus saved money on the live-action filming in order to achieve a better space sequence. They expected To Fly! to be compared with the Cinerama classic 2001: A Space Odyssey (1968) and, despite their limited resources, tried to make the space sequence as reminiscent of that film as possible. When reading about the film's production, they learned that small objects like stars on an IMAX presentation is much smaller on a traditional presentation; after some difficulty, they created stars on a Kodalith sheet negative. They also learned about the importance of movement from 2001. Because of the nature of IMAX, they could only film the space sequence at six and twelve frames per second (fps), and the use of stop motion is impossible. Additional limitations prompted detailed communication with the NASM to help assist the production. George Casey and Lester Novros of Graphic Films provided planetary models and studio facilities, and also assisted production.

According to Blyth, "The [space]ship was a  transparency of a  starship model rear-lighted on a stationary glass frame"; MacGillivray and Freeman constructed it, and Blyth designed it to have the same color palette as the 747. The starship's components were based on ideas about propulsion systems like advanced ion thrusters, and magnetically confined fusions like deuterium-3 and helium-3. The models took 150 hours to create. For a scene in which the spaceship passes Jupiter and Io, they filmed different elements in separate film stocks; each shot "required four separate passes of the negative through the camera, each time being rewound to heads and rethreaded to a common start frame". The camera was placed on a motorized dolly. Io was filmed first, then Jupiter, then the spaceship. Some scenes, including one at Saturn, were filmed at a homemade animation stand; others used a discount version of the slit-scan photography kit used for 2001. Models were attached to a modified auxiliary peg bar, near which the glass sheet with the starship was suspended. To film extremely slow scenes, several motors and control devices were tested; zoom motors were determined to work the best. To add movement to the shots, a geared head and a custom gear operated by the zoom motor were used, creating a slight pan. They filmed all these scenes on 16 mm film first to ensure that they could be replicated on IMAX.

Bellows and close-up lenses by Hasselblad were used for the penultimate nebulae shots; the camera was facing a water-filled tray. The nebulae were a mixture of black ink and white enamel paint, with color coming from lighting gel. The materials' temperature, thickness, size, and type had to be precise to achieve the reaction. Because the crew had to film these specific shots at 96 fps, mineral oil and paint thinner were poured into the tray the slow down movement; the latter was favored because it created more-interesting movements akin to the three-dimensional effect. Often, a small wire was shaped and dipped into the tray to create specific patterns. Special effects designers Jim Palmer and Barney Kaelin created the laser beam effects; they had |experimented with various types of patterns pre-production. Overall, the space sequence took four-and-a-half months to prepare, test, and film.

Post-production 

To Fly! was edited by MacGillivray and Freeman, with Alexander Hammid supervising, on a Moviola. Knowing they would experiment with editing styles, the film's shots were directed beforehand to allow them to do so. Pacing is normal so audiences have enough time to explore the entirety of the shots. In the opening, the part where Ezekiel is still at ground is windowboxed to 1⁄6th of the IMAX surface; as he ascends, all of the screen is used, overwhelming the senses and as a reference to aviation, which the film calls "like the opening of a new eye". The goal of giving audiences a good impression of IMAX was taken from the similarly styled opening scene of This is Cinerama (1952). Multi-screen images—the placing of duplicate images on the same screen— were occasionally used; these were inspired by the multi-projector film Labyrinth (1967) and the first IMAX film Tiger Child (1970). In one scene of the Blue Angels, the screen divides into 36 segments, all of which show the same shot. After learning an inconsiderately-placed multi-screen scene would create a confusing experience for audiences, Jim Liles of the Optical Department at Metro-Goldwyn-Mayer and filmmaker Dennis Earl Moore designed new mattes in which the bottom row is 15% larger than the top, allowing for clearer focus of attention. Smith supervised research for the stock footage to be incorporated into the multi-screen scenes, and chose footage filmed by MacGillivray. After editing, a Cinemeccanica Norelco AAII 35 mm-70 mm projector was installed at their studio; they sat close to the screen to get a feeling of the way To Fly! would look on IMAX. The film took four months to edit.

According to MacGillivray, audio is a crucial component in To Fly!, and he wanted the most suitable person to compose the score. It was composed and conducted by Bernardo Segall and performed by a 49-piece orchestra at The Burbank Studios, which MacGillivray considered to be "the most professional and experienced symphonic" in California that he could find. Segall was chosen because he was considered a great classical composer whose works have "an air of sophistication and elegance, which would maintain the steady rhythm and pulse of the film". The score was the first in history to use a keyed bugle, which is also depicted in the film's opening sequence: during the gathering for Ezekiel's ascent, a small fanfare band plays a fife, drum, clarinet, and B♭ keyed bugle. The score was edited by Richard R. McCurdy and mixed by Dan Wallin, with a quadrophonic surround sound experience in mind.. It was recorded on a 16-track recorder and was mixed down to three of the six channels of the 35 mm film, which is where the audio would be embedded for an IMAX screening.

Some post-production works were done at Todd-AO's mixing facility in Hollywood; Joseph Ellison, later the creator of Don't Go in the House (1980), participated in this segment. For the sound effects, Sam Shaw was the editor while Ray West and Jack Woltz were mixers. Because of IMAX's advanced sound technology, some scenes in the film were made just for the audio experience. For example, a multi-screen scene in which two jet airplanes cross each other uses the surround nature of the sound system; MacGillivray expected audiences to "shiver" due to the dramatic shift of attention. In the locomotive screen-hitting scene, the engine noises gradually surround the audience. Conoco later attributed themselves as the film's sponsor.

Themes and style 

To Fly! depicts how the imagination of the American people pioneered aviation, and how aerial scenes revolutionized it. This is illustrated with scenes of aircraft flying over American landscapes. Critic Daniel Eagan said most of the views depicted in the film's opening sequence is "stately, processional, celebrating the American landscape while remaining distant from it". From there, the film explores the US, "igniting patriotic empathy". It was also viewed as a nationalist film, linking the American quest for national identity to the development of aviation through metanarratives, as well as the linear, westward progress of aviation, though its visual rhetoric shines only in the space sequence. MacGillivray supported these analyses, calling the film "an audiovisual voyage through time". The Smithsonian, in reference to the film's final narration, said its theme is: "Flight, in all its forms, is part of the Human condition, part of our Destiny". This refers to manifest destiny, a mythic cultural belief that foreshadows the American westward expansion; this motif guides the film through its euphoric narrative.

Collins said To Fly! style makes it "a break from the learning going on in the rest of the museum", and NASM former assistant LeRoy London, alongside Chief of Presentations and Education Von Del Chamberlain, said it is an amplification of visitors' fascination of flying after seeing the museum's exhibits. Film author Alison Griffiths said the film is an add-on to a museum admission: whereas the exhibits give visitors information and interest, the film gives them a sense of wonder exhibits may fail to provide. This is achieved through its immersive cinematography, which provides viewers with vicarious participation. Steve McKerrow of The Baltimore Sun noted certain scenes are tributes to cinematic history: the scene in which a train hits the camera is similar to one from The Great Train Robbery (1903); the hot-air balloon scenes are reminiscent of Around the World in 80 Days (1956); and the barnstorming scene is probably set in the same field as North by Northwest (1959) crop duster chase scene. To Fly! has been deemed a travelogue of the US, which is compared to the closing section of This is Cinerama, which has a similar narrative. The many aerial shots of land and nature can be interpreted as symbolizing flight's use in cartography, reconnaissance, resource exploration, land-use planning, and navigation.

Release

NASM 

The first press announcements of To Fly! were issued on May 16, 1976, and on June 24, a preview of the film was screened at the NASM's Samuel P. Langley IMAX Theater. Two days prior to the film's release, Freeman was killed in a helicopter crash while scouting locations in the Sierra Nevada. Grief-stricken, MacGillivray initially doubted he could continue filmmaking but remained in the industry, keeping the production company's name, MacGillivray Freeman Films (MFF), as a tribute. Freeman's death made To Fly! his final work. The film premiered to big demand at Langley Theater on July 1, 1976. Conoco labeled the film a public service, and was also distributor. Lawrence Associates was co-distributor.

MacGillivray assisted the inexperienced Langley projectionists and frequently visited the projection booth to ensure the film roll was in good condition. Pachelbel's Canon in D was played as an overture; it was praised as memorable, relaxing, religiously experiential, and meaningful. The music has been interpreted as being about humanity's quest to fly, aligning with the film it accompanied. After September 6 (Labor Day), Conoco began distributing the film to schools, organizations, and non-IMAX theaters. Like other Bicentennial films, To Fly! was initially scheduled for a one-year run but kept the film due to audience demand. In the 1990s, they upgraded the theater's sound system to digital and also released the film for digital projection. At times, there were 14 shows daily.

A 20th-anniversary special edition of To Fly! was screened in 1996, using a new version of the score. This is exemplarily seen in the theme music in which a masculine chant of the melody was added, as well as a shot of a forest with a feminine sigh added to the score as the expanse is revealed. To mark the film's 35th anniversary, screenings were charged at 50 cents for adults and 25 cents for children, the same price used until the 1980s; during its opening, it was charged at $1 for adults and 50 cents for children. The Airbus IMAX Theater of the Steven F. Udvar-Hazy Center has screened the film it since its opening.

Other theaters 
To Fly! spurred the construction of new IMAX theaters in the US and internationally; there were previously just five in the US. The Smithsonian later also built an IMAX theater, named after Samuel C. Johnson, at the NMNH. Museums "went crazy" over the film, specifically the transformative opening sequence. Michael Kernan of The Washington Post credited word of mouth to the film's popularity because marketing was limited to brochures, newspaper advertising, and  television spots booked by theaters. MacGillivray did not expect the film to be so popular, and credited Freeman's talent to its success. The film was screened in multiple formats, including 16 mm, 70 mm, and IMAX 4K Laser. For the first 15 months after it opened in April 1983, To Fly! was the only film shown at the IMAX theater at the National Museum of Photography, Film & Television in Bradford, England; the museum stated its "breathtaking" and "beautiful" visuals reflect their mission to showcase giant-screen films. It was screened in 2013 for the museum's 30th anniversary.

At the NASM and American Museum of Natural History's Naturemax Theater, also part of the Smithsonian, the film preceded the world travelogue Living Planet (1979) in a double feature. The NASM later replaced Living Planet with MFF's Speed (1984). To Fly! was translated to French and formed part of another double feature with Blue Planet (1990) at the Montreal Science Centre IMAX theater to "relive the greatest moments of man's conquest to the skies". The film was the premiere film for three theme park IMAX theaters; Six Flags Great America's Pictorium IMAX Theater (1979),  Dreamworld IMAX Theater in Gold Coast, Australia, (1981), and the Speelland Beekse Bergen's IMAX theater at Hilvarenbeek, Netherlands (June 19, 1981). Dreamworld's founder John Longhurst was inspired to build the IMAX theater after seeing the "exciting" To Fly!. It has also been shown at IMAX theaters in Germany, Japan, Mexico, Indonesia (Keong Emas IMAX Theater, Jakarta), and other countries.

The film has been translated to 10 languages as of 2012, when nearly 150 theaters had screened it, with MFF reporting more than 200 in 2021. It has also been screened at film festivals, including the 2019 IMAX Victoria Film Festival, combined with North of Superior (1971), the second IMAX film, in a double feature dubbed "The Dawn of IMAX Filmmaking". To Fly! has seldom been screened in non-IMAX theaters, making it unpopular among filmgoers.

Home media 

In 1985, To Fly! was released on videocassette formats Betamax and VHS, and on an NTSC LaserDisc on December 12, 1991, which was manufactured by Pioneer USA and released by Lumivision. On March 20, 2011, the VHS release was preserved at the Hagley Museum and Library and is freely available at the Hagley Digital Archives. The VHS version is distinct in that the original, square opening sequence was edited to fill the entire screen, and that a large portion of the opening drum roll was cut. The LaserDisc release of the film is divided into 12 chapters and presented in a 1.33:1 aspect ratio rather than the original 1.43:1 IMAX aspect ratio. The title color was changed to light gray.

Digitally, the film was later released on Amazon Prime Video. On October 7, 2021, MFF launched a streaming service called Movies For Families and included To Fly! anniversary edition, which is presented in the widescreen aspect ratio of 1.78:1.

Reception

Box office 

To Fly! is regarded as the first IMAX film to be distributed on a large scale. Over one million people watched it during its first year at Langley Theater with approximately 80% of its 485 seats occupied. The Elyria Chronicle Telegram claimed a first-year audience of eight million. As of 1980, Langley Theater amassed more than 6.3 million viewers, with an average seat occupation of 77%. It is likely more than 100 million people have watched it in theaters; over 15 million of those at the NASM; 4.5 million of which were in the first four years, and reaching 13 million in 1996. On the day of its 20th anniversary, a CBS This Morning report dubbed it "the longest-running ticketed film in one location in history". As of 1996, the film accumulated over 300 million views worldwide. Initially, Collins had only projected three-and-a-half of NASM visitors would view the film during its initial one-year run. The Lodi News-Sentinel reported in 1991 over 100 million people have viewed To Fly! at schools and on television.

Earnings of the film were used for theater maintenance and financing future IMAX productions. It grew from $20 million in 1993 to $100 million in 1999. To Fly! was the third-highest-grossing IMAX documentary as of 2002, earning $113 million, behind The Dream is Alive (1985, $150 million) and MFF's Everest (1998, $114 million). The Numbers reported it grossed over $86.6 million within the US and Canada and $34.1 million elsewhere for a worldwide total of $120.7 million. According to a 2003 Duke University Press publication, however, it grossed more than $150 million worldwide. On the other hand, MFF reported $135 million as of April 2015. It was the highest-grossing documentary of all time before Fahrenheit 9/11 (2004) and remains the second-highest-grossing giant-screen documentary film after Everest. The film is the longest-exhibited documentary in the world, the longest-running sponsored Washington, D.C. film, as well as the highest-grossing sponsored film. It also set several other box-office records. According to The Numbers, it is—in the US and Canada—the second-highest-grossing 1976 film behind Rocky, which grossed $117,235,147, and above A Star is Born, which grossed $63,129,898.

Reviews 

To Fly! was well-received by many film critics. John Alderson of the Chicago Sun-Times summarized his and others' reviews with: "The subject [of To Fly!] charms its imagination, while the IMAX format goes right to the brink of [audiovisual] sensory overload". Contemporary critics called it underrated and electric. The Washington Post called it a Washingtonian icon and a must-watch to all Washingtonians. The film was cited as an example of the role of screen size in amplifying cinematic thrills, the power of aerial photography, and IMAX as a form of cinematic travel; as well as a pioneer of cinematic kinesthetic responses, and coverage of science and technology. Multiple reviewers called To Fly! one of the best IMAX films; with David Handler of the Newspaper Enterprise Association dubbing it "the ultimate film trip". Carl Sagan said the film still astonished him after seeing it more than five times at the NASM. It was listed among the best films and documentaries of the 1970s. BioScience and the Michelin Green Guide called it a must for NASM visitors.

The cinematography received universal acclaim for its vertiginous, aesthetic-induced thrills, equated to amusement park rides and epic films. The use of IMAX to the best advantage was praised, with soaring shots galore, and the score was said to amplify its illusion of reality. Tom Chernitsky of the Elyria Chronicle Telegram additionally credited the use of "unusual" camera angles and novel filming techniques to the film's mastery. It also received positive reviews from teachers, who said the immersive cinematography alone makes it educational because it teaches children how it feels to fly. The Tampa Tribune rated the film three out of four stars, equating its fun to a parade, deeming the Horseshoe Falls and barnstorming scenes the best. The squared segment of the opening sequence was praised for being disappointing because it does not fill the entire IMAX screen, anticipating audiences for the giant-screen moment. John Russell of The New York Times credited the cinematography to the audiences' immersion in the story despite its short duration, with the plot improving as the film progresses. Critics called it a paean and poetry film, citing its lyrical, wonderous look of nature. Dan Moran of the Lake County News-Sun said the film is one of the few Pictorium films that kept audiences awake instead of asleep. Nathan Southern of AllMovie gave the film four-and-a-half stars out of five, stating its aerial shots help it be the vivid insight to American transportation as it should, calling the film historically significant and "One of the greatest unsung landmarks of American documentary". As the filmmakers intended, the space sequence was praised as akin to 2001.

Contemporary critics are found to be more positive. The opening scene was described as intimate yet magical, the ending uplifting, as well as the narration as personal and meditative. The film's combination of vintage and contemporary settings was said to amplify its emotional and nostalgic weight. Modern critics were more analytical, panning some of the film's uneven and inconsistent editing; it was also pointed out that the balloon also does not appear to be moving. Ezekiel was deemed banal and pretentious, and the omissions of real-life aviation pioneers were noted. The Betamax sound mixing is called "rudimentary", though these shortcomings fade during the spaceflight scene, according to filmmaker Mark R. Hasan. Stuart Heritage of The Guardian put the film in the "dreary, educational" category of IMAX documentaries. Jeremy Smith of Yardbarker praised the film's effective motivation but said its use of IMAX is a gimmick, albeit a good one. Eagan disagrees, stating the film's scenes are still breathtaking, even in small formats. Documentarian Ross Anthony gave it a B+ grade, noting he would have graded it A in a contemporary review. He deemed To Fly! "amusing and informative (on a basic level)", recommending the short IMAX experimental film Silent Sky (1977), to which he gave a more positive review, for aviation enthusiasts.

Audience response 

Audiences, regardless of demographics, have been "astonished" by To Fly! IMAX vertiginous shots since its release. The audience reportedly shouted and gasped throughout, especially during the balloon opening sequence, as well as the Blue Angels and hang-gliding scenes. Others, however, screamed in jolt and "hastily" left the theater during its vertiginous scenes, and for some, uncontrollable dizziness lingered long after the film had finished. Sickness bags were also unavailable, which is said to make the film partially inaccessible. Later, the NASM added pre-entry warnings about potential dizziness and motion sickness.

Audiences also found the film to be memorable. People with a fear of flying said they were able to watch To Fly! without getting scared. Those who watched it returned with their children to watch the film, akin to a generational tradition. The 2011 Virginia earthquake coincided with the screening of To Fly! Horseshoe Falls at Lockheed Martin; audiences assumed the shaking they felt came from the theater's subwoofers rather than an earthquake. Expert hang-gliders were surprised at the hang-gliding stunt: "[42] years later, Bob Wills and To Fly! can blow even these guys away". Wills died in 1977 while hang-gliding for a commercial.

The audience responses prompted the Smithsonian to market the film on their website with; "Feel the Earth Drop Away Beneath You". In 2016, "Feel" was changed to "Watch" as part of a longer synopsis; a 40th-anniversary, one-minute trailer was also released. Responding to the film's popularity, Bill McCabe of DuPont Aerospace Enterprise said because humans have a supposedly innate interest in flying, the film has an appeal to everyone. MacGillivray said that the film's "unpretentiousness and lightheartedness" makes it a form of escapism and that its unconventional ending makes it "more profound and in a way, more lasting".

Accolades 
As of 1992, To Fly! had received 11 awards. The following table only lists the accolades listed by MFF as the only available source, until further update.

Legacy 

Critics hailed To Fly! as a contemporary and classic blockbuster. Filmmaker and author Lenny Lipton called the film the giant screen industry's "signature film". Wilkman, writing for Literary Hub, listed the film in 2020 as one of the "21 Documentaries That Redefined the Genre". The Washington Post listed the film as one of the top three reasons people visited Washington, D.C. in 1980. The film has a significant history with political figures; it was viewed by government officials of the Soviet Union, Spain, United Kingdom, Egypt, Indonesia, the US, and Greece. During his first inauguration (1981), US President Ronald Reagan handed a copy of it to Soviet General Secretary Mikhail Gorbachev; Reagan later attended the film's Soviet premiere in Moscow. When George H. W. Bush met Israeli Prime Minister Yitzhak Shamir on April 6, 1989, they went to the NASM and watched To Fly!.

Contrary to popular belief, To Fly! is not the first in IMAX, though was instrumental in introducing a larger audience of the then-new format. Many IMAX filmmakers also acknowledged the film's significance. Kieth Merrill credited To Fly! with the success of IMAX. Ron Fricke made the art film Chronos (1985) in IMAX after seeing To Fly!, and regretted not filming his more-popular film Koyaanisqatsi (1982) in IMAX; MacGillivray was the latter's Second Unit aerial photographer. Brian J. Terwilliger, who made the IMAX documentary Living in the Age of Airplanes (2015), chose to theatrically premiere it at Lockheed Martin as a tribute to To Fly! which he watched when he was in eighth grade. Christopher Nolan was inspired to make visually immersive films after watching To Fly! at the age of 14 and noticing the audience tilted their heads during the flying sequences; MacGillivray consulted Nolan on the IMAX cameras for The Dark Knight Rises (2012), whose aerial scenes were inspired by it. Astronaut Terry W. Virts, who starred in the IMAX documentary A Beautiful Planet (2016), called To Fly! one of his most-memorable childhood IMAX films.

The film was also cited as a great influence on the legitimization of IMAX and the use of multi-screen scenes in IMAX films, which has been common practice ever since. In a contemporary review, major film companies were urged to "watch out", predicting To Fly! would set IMAX as a leading cinematic format. In 1995, the Library of Congress called To Fly! a pioneer of the IMAX format, thus "culturally, historically, or aesthetically significant" enough to be preserved by the National Film Registry. Voters at the Giant Screen Theater Association inducted it into the IMAX Hall of Fame on September 24, 2001, a decision praised by then-co-chief executive officers Richard Gelfond and Bradley J. Wechsler, stating the film deserves such recognition. It was also preserved at the National Archives and Records Administration and the Smithsonian Institution Archives.

In 1980, upon To Fly! popularity, the NASM requested Conoco to collaborate with MacGillivray and Moore on another short IMAX film called Flyers (1982), which became MacGillivray's second IMAX film. It too became an instant success, though at a slower rate than To Fly!, and on March 4, 1982, Random House launched an eponymous companion picture book for children. Flyers was also shown in Rotterdam, Netherlands, following To Fly! as part of a double feature. MFF continued making IMAX documentaries, including The Living Sea (1995), which was inducted into the IMAX Hall of Fame and nominated for Best Short Documentary at the 68th Academy Awards; and Dolphins (2000). which was the highest-grossing documentary of that year and was also nominated for Best Short Documentary at the 73rd Academy Awards. Still active, the company was credited for the success of IMAX, and one of the most influential and notable IMAX figures with over $1 billion at the box office; Lea Silver of IMAX Victoria called him "a big deal". In 1984, the making of a film using outtakes from To Fly! and Flyers was proposed but this never happened. Instead, MacGillivray released The Magic of Flight (1996), a sequel that was inspired by To Fly! Blue Angels sequence.

See also 

 Educational entertainment
 List of IMAX films
 Sonnet 18, whose concluding couplet is recited by one of the film's characters to his lover

Notes

References

External links

To Fly! at Movies For Families

"To Fly!", an excerpt from James Tobin's book To Conquer the Air: The Wright Brothers and the Great Race for Flight, at the Smithsonian magazine

1976 films
American short documentary films
Documentary films about aviation
Short films directed by Greg MacGillivray
IMAX short films
United States National Film Registry films
1976 documentary films
1976 short films
MacGillivray Freeman Films films
1970s short documentary films
IMAX documentary films
Films scored by Bernardo Segall
American docudrama films
Articles containing video clips
1970s English-language films
1970s American films